Neville may refer to:

Places
Neville, New South Wales, Australia
Neville, Saskatchewan, Canada
Néville, in the Seine-Maritime department, France
Néville-sur-Mer, in the Manche department, France
Neville, Ohio, USA
Neville Township, Pennsylvania, USA

People
Neville (name), including a list of people and characters with the name
House of Neville, a noble family of England
Neville (wrestler), ring name of Benjamin Satterley, a British professional wrestler

Other uses
USS Neville (APA-9), a Heywood-class attack transport in the United States Navy
Neville (Thomas the Tank Engine), a railway engine in Thomas & Friends
Concrete Aboriginal, a lawn ornament in Australia also known as a "Neville"

See also
Fifehead Neville, Dorset, England
Tarring Neville, East Sussex, England
Neville's algorithm, used for polynomial interpolation
The Neville Brothers, American band
Naville, a surname
Nevil (disambiguation)
 Nevill (disambiguation)
 Nevills (disambiguation)